Zachariah T. Woodall (September 1849 – September 12, 1899) was a soldier in the U.S. Army who served with the 6th U.S. Cavalry during the Red River War, and later in the Spanish–American War. He was one of six men who received the Medal of Honor who, while in command of an 8-man courier detail, engaged in a running battle with a hostile force of 125 Indians at the Washita River in Texas on September 12, 1874.

Biography
Born in Alexandria, Virginia in 1849, Zachariah T. Woodall enlisted in the U.S. Army following the American Civil War. Sent out west to the frontier, Woodall became an experienced Native American fighter and eventually reached the rank of sergeant. During the Red River War, he served on the Texas frontier with the 6th U.S. Cavalry. On the morning of September 12, 1874, Woodall led a 6-man courier detail including cavalry troopers Pvt. John Harrington, Pvt. Peter Roth, Pvt. George W. Smith, and civilian scouts Amos Chapman and Billy Dixon. They were assigned to find a supply train under Captain Wyllys Lyman and direct them to Colonel Nelson A. Miles' new encampment on McClellan Creek. On their way to the wagon train, Woodall and his men were suddenly ambushed and encircled by a force of 125 Native Americans at the Washita River.

Caught out in the open, and with virtually no cover, Woodall and his men dismounted and engaged the Native Americans. After four hours of fighting, they had lost their horses and all the soldiers had been wounded. Making their way to a nearby buffalo wallow, they continued fighting the Native Americans throughout the day and managed to hold the hostiles off despite being outnumbered 25-to-1. They were eventually found by members of the 8th U.S. Cavalry, then rescued by Colonel Miles' troops and brought to Fort Supply to recover from their wounds. All six men, including Woodall, were awarded the Medal of Honor for their participation in what would become known as the Battle of Buffalo Wallow. Woodall remained in the military for the next 25 years. While serving in the Spanish–American War, he died at Cabana Fortress in Havana, Cuba on September 12, 1899. He was later interred in Arlington National Cemetery.

Medal of Honor citation
Rank and organization: Sergeant, Company I, 6th U.S. Cavalry. Place and date: At Wichita River, Tex., 12 September 1874. Entered service at: ------. Birth: Alexandria, Va. Date of issue: 7 November 1874.

Citation:

While in command of 5 men and carrying dispatches, was attacked by 125 Indians, who, he with his command fought throughout the day, he being severely wounded.

See also

 List of Medal of Honor recipients for the Spanish–American War

References

Further reading
 Neal, Charles M. Valor Across the Lone Star: The Congressional Medal of Honor in Frontier Texas. Austin: Texas State Historical Association, 2003. 
 Nunnally, Michael L. American Indian Wars: A Chronology of Confrontations Between Native Peoples and Settlers and the United States Military, 1500s-1901. McFarland, 2007. 
 White, Lonnie J. and Jerry Keenan. Hostiles and Horse Soldiers: Indian Battles and Campaigns in the West. Boulder: Pruett Publishing Company, 1972. 
 Wilson, D. Ray. Terror on the Plains: A Clash of Cultures. Dundee, Illinois: Crossroads Communications, 1999. 

1849 births
1899 deaths
American military personnel of the Indian Wars
American military personnel of the Spanish–American War
United States Army Medal of Honor recipients
Military personnel from Alexandria, Virginia
Burials at Arlington National Cemetery
United States Army soldiers
American Indian Wars recipients of the Medal of Honor